Eulimella sudis is a species of sea snail, a marine gastropod mollusk in the family Pyramidellidae, the pyrams and their allies.

Distribution
This species occurs in the following locations:
 European waters (ERMS scope)

Notes
Additional information regarding this species:
 Habitat: Known from seamounts and knolls

References

External links
 To CLEMAM
 To Encyclopedia of Life
 To World Register of Marine Species

sudis
Gastropods described in 1999